Robert Fulton (November 14, 1765 – February 24, 1815) was an American engineer and inventor who is widely credited with developing the world's first commercially successful steamboat, the  (also known as Clermont). The success of his steamboat changed river traffic and trade on major American rivers.

In 1800, Fulton had been commissioned by Napoleon Bonaparte, leader of France, to attempt to design a submarine; he then produced , the first practical submarine in history. Fulton is also credited with inventing some of the world's earliest naval torpedoes for use by the Royal Navy.

Fulton became interested in steam engines and the idea of steamboats in 1777 when he was around age 12 and visited state delegate William Henry of Lancaster, Pennsylvania, who was interested in this topic. Henry had learned about inventor James Watt and his Watt steam engine on an earlier visit to England.

Early life

Robert Fulton was born on a farm in Little Britain, Pennsylvania, on November 14, 1765. His father, Robert Fulton, married Mary Smith, daughter of Captain Joseph Smith and sister of Col. Lester Smith, a comparatively well off family. He had three sisters – Isabella,  Elizabeth, and Mary, and a younger brother, Abraham.

For six years, he lived in Philadelphia, where he painted portraits and landscapes, drew houses and machinery, and was able to send money home to help support his mother. In 1785, Fulton bought a farm at Hopewell Township in Washington County near Pittsburgh for £80  (equivalent to $ in 2018), and moved his mother and family into it.

Jobs

Career in Europe (1786–1806)

At the age of 23, Fulton traveled to Europe, where he would live for the next twenty years. He went to England in 1786, carrying several letters of introduction to Americans abroad from prominent individuals he had met in Philadelphia. He had already corresponded with artist Benjamin West; their fathers had been close friends. West took Fulton into his home, where Fulton lived for several years and studied painting. Fulton gained many commissions painting portraits and landscapes, which allowed him to support himself. He continued to experiment with mechanical inventions.

Fulton became caught up in the enthusiasm of the "Canal Mania". In 1793 he began developing his ideas for tugboat canals with inclined planes instead of locks. He obtained a patent for this idea in 1794, and also began working on ideas for the steam power of boats. He published a pamphlet about canals and patented a dredging machine and several other inventions. In 1794, he moved to Manchester to gain practical knowledge of English canal engineering. While there he became friendly with Robert Owen, a cotton manufacturer and early socialist. Owen agreed to finance the development and promotion of Fulton's designs for inclined planes and earth-digging machines; he was instrumental in introducing the American to a canal company, which awarded him a sub-contract. But Fulton was not successful at this practical effort and he gave up the contract after a short time.

As early as 1793, Fulton proposed plans for steam-powered vessels to both the United States and British governments. The first steamships had appeared considerably earlier. The earliest steam-powered ship, in which the engine moved oars, was built by Claude de Jouffroy in France. Called Palmipède, it was tested on the Doubs in 1776. In 1783, de Jouffroy built , the first paddle steamer, which sailed successfully on the Saône. The first successful trial run of a steamboat in America had been made by inventor John Fitch, on the Delaware River on August 22, 1787. William Symington had successfully tried steamboats in 1788, and it seems probable that Fulton was aware of these developments.

In Britain, Fulton met the Duke of Bridgewater, Francis Egerton, whose canal, the first to be constructed in the country, was being used for trials of a steam tug. Fulton became very enthusiastic about the canals, and wrote a 1796 treatise on canal construction, suggesting improvements to locks and other features. Working for the Duke of Bridgewater between 1796 and 1799, Fulton had a boat constructed in the Duke's timber yard, under the supervision of Benjamin Powell. After installation of the machinery supplied by the engineers Bateman and Sherratt of Salford, the boat was duly christened Bonaparte in honour of Fulton having served under Napoleon. After expensive trials, because of the configuration of the design, the team feared the paddles might damage the clay lining of the canal and eventually abandoned the experiment.

In 1797, Fulton went to Paris, where he was well known as an inventor. He studied French and German, along with mathematics and chemistry. Fulton also exhibited the first panorama painting to be shown in Paris, Pierre Prévost's Vue de Paris depuis les Tuileries (1800), on what is still called Rue des Panoramas (Panorama Street) today. While living in France, Fulton designed the first working muscle-powered submarine, between 1793 and 1797. He also experimented with torpedoes. When tested, his submarine operated underwater for 17 minutes in 25 feet of water. He asked the government to subsidize its construction, but he was turned down twice. Eventually, he approached the Minister of Marine and, in 1800, was granted permission to build. The shipyard Perrier in Rouen built it, and the submarine sailed first in July 1800 on the Seine River in the same city.

In France, Fulton met Robert R. Livingston, who was appointed U.S. Ambassador to France in 1801. He also had a scientifically curious mind, and the two men decided to collaborate on building a steamboat and to try operating it on the Seine. Fulton experimented with the water resistance of various hull shapes, made drawings and models, and had a steamboat constructed. At the first trial the boat ran perfectly, but the hull was later rebuilt and strengthened. On August 9, 1803, when this boat was driven up the River Seine, it sank.

In 1804, Fulton switched allegiance and moved to Britain, where he was commissioned by Prime Minister William Pitt the Younger to build a range of weapons for use by the Royal Navy during Napoleon's invasion scares. Among his inventions were the world's first modern naval "torpedoes" (modern "mines"). These were tested, along with several other of his inventions, during the 1804 Raid on Boulogne, but met with limited success. Although Fulton continued to develop his inventions with the British until 1806, the crushing naval victory by Admiral Horatio Nelson at the 1805 Battle of Trafalgar greatly reduced the risk of French invasion. Fulton was increasingly sidelined as a result.

Career in the United States (1806–1815)
In 1806, Fulton returned to the United States. In 1807, he and Robert R. Livingston built the first commercially successful steamboat,  (later known as Clermont). Livingston's shipping company began using it to carry passengers between New York City and up the Hudson River to the state capital Albany. Clermont made the  trip in 32 hours. Passengers on the maiden voyage included a lawyer Jones and his family from Bethlehem, Pennsylvania. His infant daughter Alexandra Jones later served as a Union nurse on a steamboat hospital in the American Civil War.

The Clermont was the first real steamboat in America. While it was being built people called it "Fulton's Folly". The Clermont had sails as well as a steam engine. At each end of the boat was a short mast with a small square sail that could be unfurled when needed. The engine was in the center of the boat and was surrounded by cord wood. The engine was 24-horsepower. Above the engine was a tall and slender smoke stack. On each side was a big paddle wheel that was open and uncovered. Its displacement was 160 tons.

From 1811 until his death, Fulton was a member of the Erie Canal Commission, appointed by the Governor of New York.

Fulton's final design was the floating battery . This first steam-driven warship in the world was built for the United States Navy for the War of 1812. The heavy vessel was not completed until after Fulton's death and was named in his honor.

From October 1811 to January 1812, Fulton, along with Livingston and Nicholas Roosevelt (1767–1854), worked together on a joint project to build a new steamboat, sturdy enough to take down the Ohio and Mississippi rivers to New Orleans, Louisiana. This was less than a decade after the United States had acquired the Louisiana Territory from France. These rivers were not well settled, mapped, or protected. By achieving this first breakthrough voyage and also proving the ability of the steamboat to travel upstream against powerful river currents, Fulton changed the entire trade and transportation outlook for the American heartland.

Fulton was elected a member of the American Antiquarian Society in 1814.

Personal life

On January 8, 1808, Fulton married Harriet Livingston (1783–1826), the daughter of Walter Livingston and niece of Robert R. Livingston, prominent men in the Hudson River area, whose family dated to the colonial era.  Harriet, who was nineteen years his junior, was well educated and was an accomplished amateur painter and musician.  Together, they had four children:

 Robert Barlow Fulton (1808–1841), who died unmarried.
 Julia Fulton (1810–1848), who married lawyer Charles Blight of Philadelphia.
 Cornelia Livingston Fulton (1812–1893), who married lawyer Edward Charles Crary (1806–1848) in 1831.
 Mary Livingston Fulton (1813–1861), who married Robert Morris Ludlow (1812–1894), parents of Robert Fulton Ludlow.

Fulton died in 1815 in New York City from tuberculosis (then known as "consumption"). He had been walking home on the frozen Hudson River when one of his friends, Thomas Addis Emmet, fell through the ice. In rescuing his friend, Fulton got soaked with icy water. He is believed to have contracted pneumonia. When he got home, his sickness worsened. He was diagnosed with consumption and died at 49 years old. After his death, his widow remarried to Charles Augustus Dale on November 26, 1816.

He is buried in the Trinity Church Cemetery for Trinity Church (Episcopal) at Wall Street in New York City, near other notable Americans such as former U.S. Secretaries of the Treasury, Alexander Hamilton and Albert Gallatin. His descendants include Cory Lidle, a former Major League Baseball pitcher.

Legacy

Posthumous honors
The Commonwealth of Pennsylvania donated a marble statue of Fulton to the National Statuary Hall Collection in the United States Capitol. Fulton was also honored for his development of steamship technology in New York City's Hudson-Fulton Celebration of the Centennial in 1909. A replica of his first steam-powered steam vessel, Clermont, was built for the occasion.

Five ships of the United States Navy have borne the name  in honor of Robert Fulton.

Fulton Hall at the United States Merchant Marine Academy houses the Department of Marine Engineering and included laboratories for diesel and steam engineering, refrigeration, marine engineering, thermodynamics, materials testing, machine shop, mechanical engineering, welding, electrical machinery, control systems, electric circuits, engine room simulators and graphics.

Bronze statues of Fulton and Christopher Columbus represent commerce on the balustrade of the galleries of the Main Reading Room in the Thomas Jefferson Building of the Library of Congress on Capitol Hill in Washington, D.C. They are two of 16 historical figures, each pair representing one of the 8 pillars of civilization.

The Guatemalan government in 1910 erected a bust of Fulton in one of the parks of Guatemala City.

In 2006, Fulton was inducted into the "National Inventors Hall of Fame" in Alexandria, Virginia.

Places named for Fulton
Many places in the U.S. are named for Robert Fulton, including:

Counties

 Fulton County, Georgia
 Fulton County, Illinois
 Fulton County, Indiana
 Fulton County, Kentucky
 Fulton County, New York
 Fulton County, Ohio
 Fulton County, Pennsylvania

Cities and towns

 Fulton, New York (disambiguation)
 Fulton, Arkansas
 Fulton, Mississippi
 Fulton, Illinois
 Fulton, Missouri
 Fulton, Oswego County, New York
 Fulton, Schoharie County, New York
 Fulton Township, Lancaster County, Pennsylvania
 Fultonham, Ohio
 Fultonville, New York
 Fulton, Texas

Other places

 Fulton Avenue in Sacramento, California
 Fulton Street in Berkeley, California
 Fulton Chain Lakes, New York
 Robert Fulton Elementary School, Chicago
 Robert Fulton Elementary, Cleveland, Ohio (closed)
 Fulton Elementary School, Dubuque, Iowa
 Fulton Elementary School, Fulton Township, Lancaster County, Pennsylvania
 Fulton Hall, State Quad, University at Albany, (State University of New York at Albany)
 Fulton Neighborhood in Minneapolis, Minnesota
 Fulton Opera House, Lancaster, Pennsylvania
 Fulton Park, New York City
 Fulton Steamboat Inn, hotel in Lancaster County, Pennsylvania
 Fulton Street in Brooklyn, New York
 BMT Fulton Street Line subway line
 IND Fulton Street Line subway line
 Fulton Street (IND Crosstown Line)
 Fulton Street in Manhattan
 Fulton Center in Manhattan
 Fulton Fish Market
 Fulton Street (New York City Subway) subway station
 Fulton Houses in Manhattan 
 Fulton Street in Alcoa, Tennessee
 Fulton Street in Anaheim, California
 Fulton Street in Grand Rapids, Michigan
 Fulton Street in Hempstead, New York
 Fulton Street in Massapequa Park, New York
 Fulton Street in New Orleans, Louisiana
 Fulton Street in San Francisco, California
 Fulton Street in York, Pennsylvania
 Fulton Street and Fulton Market in Chicago
 Robert Fulton Drive in Columbia, Howard County, Maryland
 Robert Fulton Drive in Reston, Virginia
 Robert Fulton Fire Company, Fulton Township, Lancaster County, Pennsylvania
 Robert Fulton Highway, Lancaster County, Pennsylvania
 Robert Fulton School, Philadelphia, Pennsylvania

 Fulton, a neighborhood in Cincinnati, Ohio

In popular culture
20th Century-Fox's 1940 film, Little Old New York, based on a 1920 play by Rida Johnson Young, is a fictionalized version of Fulton's life from his arrival in New York to the first sailing of Clermont. British actor Richard Greene starred as Fulton with Brenda Joyce as Harriet Livingston. Alice Faye and Fred MacMurray played wharf friends who help Fulton overcome problems to realize his dream.

A fictionalized account of Fulton's role was produced by BBC television during the 1960s. In the first serial, Triton (1961, re-made in 1968), two British naval officers, Captain Belwether and Lieutenant Lamb, are involved in spying on Fulton while he is working for the French. In the sequel, Pegasus (1969), they are surprised to find themselves working with Fulton after he changed sides. In the 1961 series, Fulton was played by Reed De Rouen, in the 1968 and 1969 series he was played by Robert Cawdron.

A Robert Fulton cartoon character appears in the 1955 Casper the Friendly Ghost short film Red, White, and Boo.

Author James McGee used Fulton's experiments in early submarine warfare (against wooden warships) as a major plot element in his 2006 novel Ratcatcher.

Invasion (2009), the tenth novel in the "Kydd" naval warfare series by Julian Stockwin, uses Fulton and his submarine as an important plot element.

Until 2016, Disney Springs at Walt Disney World had a restaurant named Fulton's Crab House with a building in the shape of a steamboat.

Gallery

Publications
 Torpedo war, and submarine explosions published 1810.
 A Treatise on the Improvement of Canal Navigation , 1796. From the University of Georgia Libraries in DjVu & layered PDF  formats.
 A Treatise on the Improvement of Canal Navigation 1796. From Rare Book Room.

See also
 Experiment (horse powered boat)

References

Sources
This article contains content first published in 1909 as Old Steamboat Days on The Hudson River.

External links

 
 Robert Fulton Birthplace
 Photos of Fulton's Birthplace
 
 CHAPTER XIII: ROBERT FULTON in Great Fortunes, and How They Were Made (1871), by James D. McCabe, Jr., Illustrated by G. F. and E. B. Bensell, a Project Gutenberg eBook.
 
 
 Examples of art by Robert Fulton at the Art Renewal Center
  Archived from the original.
 
 Booknotes interview with Kirkpatrick Sale on The Fire of His Genius: Robert Fulton and the American Dream, November 25, 2001.
Collection of Robert Fulton manuscripts – digital facsimile from the Linda Hall Library

1765 births
1815 deaths
Engineers from Pennsylvania
American inventors
Submarine pioneers
Erie Canal Commissioners
People from Lancaster County, Pennsylvania
19th-century deaths from tuberculosis
People of colonial Pennsylvania
Hall of Fame for Great Americans inductees
Burials at Trinity Church Cemetery
Tuberculosis deaths in New York (state)